David Stone (born August 14, 1966) is an American theatre producer.

Career 
Stone, a Marlboro Township, New Jersey native, studied at the University of Pennsylvania.

He had his first contact with the theatre business through an internship at Jujamcyn Theaters. Later he worked with Broadway producers Fran and Barry Weisler, before he had his first own production with the 1993 off-Broadway hit Family Secrets.

Since 2003, he has produced the musical Wicked together with Marc E. Platt. As of 2012 the show had grossed US$250 million.

Stone is a member of the Board of Governors of The Broadway League and also the Board of Trustees of Broadway Cares/Equity Fights Aids. He lectured at the Juilliard School, New York University, Yale University, Columbia University and the University of Pennsylvania.

Productions 
 1993: Family Secrets (Off-Broadway)
 1994: What's Wrong With This Picture? (Broadway)
 1996: Full Gallop (Off-Broadway)
 1996: The Santaland Diaries (Off-Broadway)
 1997–1998: The Diary of Anne Frank (Broadway)
 1999: James Naughton: Street of Dreams (Off-Broadway)
 1999: The Vagina Monologues (Off-Broadway)
 1999: Fully Committed (Off-Broadway)
 2000: Taller Than a Dwarf (Broadway)
 2000: Lifegame (Off-Broadway)
 2000-2001: The Search for Signs of Intelligent Life in the Universe (Broadway)
 2002-2003: The Graduate (Broadway)
 2002-2003: Man of La Mancha (Broadway)
 Seit 2003: Wicked (Broadway)
 2005-2008: The 25th Annual Putnam County Spelling Bee (Broadway)
 2006: Three Days of Rain (Broadway)
 2009-2011: Next to Normal (Broadway)
 2014: If/Then (Broadway)
 2018: The Boys in the Band (Broadway)
 2022: Topdog/Underdog (Broadway)
 Seit 2022: Kimberly Akimbo (musical) (Broadway)

Awards 
 1998: Tony Award – Nominee for Tony Award for Best Revival of a Play for The Diary of Anne Frank (with Amy Nederlander-Case, Jon B. Platt, Jujamcyn Theaters, Hal Luftig, Harriet Newman Leve, James D. Stern)
 2003: Tony Award – Nominee for Tony Award for Best Revival of a Musical for Man of La Mancha (with Jon B. Platt, Susan Quint Gallin, Sandy Gallin, Seth M. Siegel, USA Ostar Theatricals, Mary Lu Roffe)
 2004: Tony Award – Nominee for Tony Award for Best Musical for Wicked (with Universal Pictures, The Araca Group, Marc Platt, Jon B. Platt)
 2005: Tony Award – Nominee for Tony Award for Best Musical for The 25th Annual Putnam County Spelling Bee (with James L. Nederlander, Barbara Whitman, Patrick Catullo, Barrington Stage Company, Second Stage Theatre)
 2009: Tony Award – Nominee for Tony Award for Best Musical for Next to Normal (with James L. Nederlander, Barbara Whitman, Patrick Catullo, Second Stage Theatre, Carole Rothman, Ellen Richard)

References

External links 
 
 
 
 David Stone at broadwayworld.com

1966 births
American theatre managers and producers
Living people
People from Marlboro Township, New Jersey
University of Pennsylvania alumni